The Defence Academy of the United Kingdom provides higher education for personnel in the British Armed Forces, Civil Service, other government departments and service personnel from other nations. The Director General of the Defence Academy is Air Marshal Ian Gale, a senior Royal Air Force officer.

Structure
The Defence Academy is headquartered at what used to be the Royal Military College of Science site at Shrivenham in southwestern Oxfordshire, though the present campus also extends into the neighbouring village of Watchfield; it delivers education and training there and in a number of other sites. The majority of training is postgraduate with many courses being accredited for the award of civilian qualifications.

The formation of the Defence Academy consolidated education and training delivered by a number of different establishments into a single organisational and budgetary structure, intended to improve efficiency, reduce duplication of effort and align delivery to defence requirements.  The Defence Academy is also responsible for the maintenance of relationships with the UK academic establishment and with military and naval service educational institutions worldwide.

Non technical research is carried out for the development of doctrine and analysis of the international security environment.

Delivery units and locations
Training is delivered by:

Royal College of Defence Studies (RCDS), Seaford House, Belgravia, London
Joint Services Command and Staff College (JSCSC), Shrivenham, Oxfordshire
Shrivenham Leadership Centre (SLC), Beckett Hall, Shrivenham
Armed Forces Chaplaincy Centre (AFCC), Amport House, Amport, Hampshire
Nuclear Department, Gosport
Defence Centre of Training Support (DCTS), Shrivenham
Technology School, Shrivenham
Business Skills College, Shrivenham
Defence Technical Undergraduate Scheme (DTUS)
Loughborough University
Aston University
University of Birmingham
Newcastle University
Northumbria University
University of Southampton
University of Portsmouth
Defence Technical Officer and Engineer Entry Scheme (DTOEES), (part of DSFC and DTUS)
Defence Engagement School, which comprises the Defence Centre for Languages & Culture, The Defence Attache and Loan Service Centre and the International Section.
Centre of Air Safety Training (Military Aviation Authority) (CoAST)

Former locations 
 Welbeck Abbey, Nottinghamshire (until 2005)
 Welbeck Defence Sixth Form College, Leicestershire (2005–2021)

Governance
The Director General of the Defence Academy was, until 2011, a three-star rank (vice admiral, lieutenant general, air marshal) which can be filled by any of the three armed services.

The Director General of the Defence Academy chairs the Defence Academy Management Board which is composed of the commandants of the constituent delivery units and Chief of Staff, Defence Academy. The commanding officer of Shrivenham Station is a separate post filled by a Royal Air Force Wing Commander.

The management board report to a four-star steering board and an advisory board including academic expertise from the private sector and academia.  A customer board at two-star level represents the customer community.

Academic provision is delivered through partnering agreements with Cranfield University and King's College London.

List of Directors General:
2002–2005: Sir Roger Jackling
2005–2008: Lieutenant General Sir John Kiszely, late Scots Guards
2008–2011: Lieutenant General Andrew Graham, late Argyll and Sutherland Highlanders
2011–2014: Peter Watkins
2014–2018: Vice Admiral Duncan Potts
2018–2021: Air Marshal Edward Stringer
2021–present: Air Marshal Ian Gale

References

External links

Defence Academy official site

Ministry of Defence (United Kingdom)
Military training establishments of the United Kingdom
Education in Oxfordshire
Educational institutions established in 2002
1772 establishments in England
Military academies of the United Kingdom
2002 establishments in the United Kingdom